Jorge Enrique Madueño Vizurraga (born 8 March 1968), better known by his stage name Pelo Madueño, is a Peruvian singer-songwriter, producer, actor, and broadcaster. In 1988 he joined the Miki González band as a drummer, with which he moved away from punk and ventured into pop rock. In 1992 he formed the band La Liga del Sueño as a vocalist, guitarist, and percussionist, releasing three studio albums and achieving fame at a national level. After the dissolution of La Liga del Sueño in 2000, he embarked on a solo career.

Career with Narcosis

With Narcosis he recorded the demo Primera dosis, which would be reissued on CD in 2000. The group broke up in 1986 after the concert "Acto de Magia".

Between Narcosis and La Liga del Sueño
In 1985, together with Rafael Hurtado and Félix Torrealva, Madueño formed the rock subterráneo group Eructo Maldonado, with whom he released the albums Qué pachó? (1986) and Rómpele la pechuga! (1988). At the same time, he began to appear on some television programs and to move away from rock subterráneo. During some recording sessions in 1987, he met Miki González, who invited him to be a drummer in his band, one of the most successful and innovative pop rock groups at that time. With them he recorded the LPs Tantas veces (1987) and Nunca les creí (1989).

Career with La Liga del Sueño

In 1991 Pelo Madueño joined up with other artists, mostly from rock subterráneo, and after experimenting with different formations and sounds, they began to perform in Lima and the provinces.

Solo career
After La Liga del Sueño went on hiatus in 2000, Madueño traveled to Spain and released his first solo album in July 2004, entitled . Its first single was "Alma de 80's", the video for which was recorded in the streets of Madrid. The album also features "Nuestro secreto", a duet sung with Joaquín Sabina.

In September 2008, he released his second production entitled , with the first single "Es hora".

That May he presented The Lovecats, a musical project that recreates rock songs in jazz versions. In July he released the second single from No te salves, titled "No hay estrellas en el mar", which features a black-and-white video directed by Tito Köster, with some scenes shot at the Gran Hotel Bolivar. In October he participated in the Movistar Expo Rock held in Chiclayo. In March 2010 he released the third single from the album, titled "Amiga".

Madueño performed a sold-out concert on 20 June 2016 at the Gran Teatro Nacional in Lima, featuring songs from his time in La Liga del Sueño and his solo albums. This was recorded and released as the live album and DVD 20 años al borde.

Discography

Albums

With Miki Gonzalez
 Tantas veces (LP, 1987)
 Nunca les creí (LP, 1989)

With La Liga del Sueño
  (1994)
  (1996)
  (1998)

Solo
  (2004)
  (2009)
  (2012)
 20 años al borde (live)

Music videos

With La Liga del Sueño
 "Mala sangre" (1994)
 "La peor de las guerras" (1996)
 "Semilla negra" (1998)
 "No es amor" (1998)

Solo
 "Alma de 80's" (2004)
 "Nuestro secreto" (2006)
 "Es hora" (2008)
 "No hay estrellas en el mar" (2009)
 "Amiga" (2010)
 "No te salves" (2011)
 "Calavera reguetón" (2012)
 "Es por amor" (2012)
 "Arena y blue" (2013)

References

External links
 
 

1968 births
21st-century Peruvian male actors
Male actors from Lima
Alternative rock drummers
Alternative rock singers
Living people
Peruvian drummers
Peruvian male film actors
20th-century Peruvian male singers
20th-century Peruvian singers
Peruvian male television actors
Peruvian radio personalities
Peruvian record producers
Pop rock singers
Punk rock drummers
Punk rock singers
Singers from Lima
21st-century Peruvian male singers
21st-century Peruvian singers